Codona 2 is the second album by the jazz trio Codona, which featured sitarist and tabla player Collin Walcott, trumpeter Don Cherry and percussionist Naná Vasconcelos. It was recorded in 1980 and released on the ECM label in 1981.

Reception

The Allmusic review by Michael G. Nastos awarded the album 3½ stars calling it "Absolutely uplifting".

John Kelman, writing for All About Jazz, commented: "Codona 2 represented a number of changes for the group which, by the time of its release in 1981, was nearly four years old... a brief traditional African tune, 'Godumaduma,' takes Codona into completely new territory—a solo feature for Walcott's sitar, overdubbed multiple times to create a pulsing, propulsive piece informed by classical composer Steve Reich's concept of pulses." Kelman noted that the recording was "critically pegged as the trio's least engaging album" but stated that "years passed, distance and the opportunity to hear the album chronologically in between its two brethren makes clear that it's an album unfairly undervalued and well worthy of reconsideration."

In an article for Between Sound and Space, Tyran Grillo praised the album's closing piece, and wrote: "'Again and Again, Again'... might as well be our listening instructions for this most underrated album of the set. Sitar and trumpet provide some vivid runes, of which Vasconcelos makes a sonic rubbing with a string of sounds not unlike a tape in fast forward, if not a dreaming bird. Add to this the plurivocity of a melodica, and one begins to see subtle density and 'vocal' qualities that make this one of the group's most inward-looking statements."

Track listing
All compositions by Collin Walcott except as indicated
 "Que Faser" (Naná Vasconcelos) - 7:07   
 "Godumaduma" (Traditional) - 1:54   
 "Malinye" (Don Cherry) - 12:39   
 "Drip-Dry" (Ornette Coleman) - 6:59   
 "Walking on Eggs" - 3:00   
 "Again and Again, Again" - 7:32
Recorded at Tonstudio Bauer in Ludwigsburg, West Germany in May 1980

Personnel
Collin Walcott — sitar, tabla, mbira, timpani, voice
Don Cherry — trumpet, melodica, doussn' gouni, voice
Naná Vasconcelos — percussion, talking drum, berimbau, voice

References

ECM Records albums
Codona albums
1981 albums
Albums produced by Manfred Eicher